AHFA may refer to:
American Home Furnishings Alliance
American Health Foods Association